Arturo Castillo, Jr. (born October 16, 1994, in Austin, Texas), better known as AJ Castillo, is an American singer of Mexican descent.  He is a cumbia, and Tejano music recording artist, accordionist, singer, performer, and producer. His debut album, "Who I Am", was released in 2009. His second album, On My Way, was released in 2010. Castillo won Best New Artist — Male at the 2010 Tejano Music Awards.

Personal life
Castillo is a native of Austin, Texas, and is a graduate of the University of Texas at San Antonio, where he was a member of the Kappa Sigma fraternity. He was introduced to the accordion by his grandfather and started playing at around the age of 10, and began his professional music career at 13 with his family band.

Career

Castillo spent several years as a studio musician. He has recorded and performed with many of the top Tejano artists in the industry. Castillo is known for his accordion sound and style, and his visually customized accordions.  Castillo entered the Tejano scene as a solo artist in 2009 and has brought a "fresh new attitude to Tejano Music".  Castillo introduced a fresh new urban/fusion sound (combining influences from Tejano, Cumbias, Jazz, Cajun, and R&B) that expands the boundaries of accordion music and has helped to energize the Tejano scene.

Referred to as a "rising star" in the Tejano industry, Castillo has released five CDs: "Who I Am", "On My Way", "The New Movement", "Sin Límites", and his most recent release and self-entitled CD "AJ Castillo".  Castillo performed at the 2009 Tejano Music Awards, and in 2010 accepted his first Tejano Music Award. In 2010 Castillo became a three time award winner, and was named the Tejano Music Awards Best New Male Artist, the Tejano Academy's Best Accordion Player, and Best Emerging Artist at the July 11, 2010, awards show in San Antonio, Texas. in 2016 the City of Austin proclaimed September 1 as AJ Castillo Day.

On September 16, 2010, Castillo hosted the "1st Annual AJ Castillo for Kids" concert, an event held to raise school supplies for children who live in the more underprivileged areas in Austin, Texas.

Castillo collaborated on the 2017 Latin Grammy Award winning Best Regional Song “Siempre Es Así”.

Band members 
 AJ Castillo - Accordion and Lead Vocals
 Sergio Castillo - Background Vocals
 Jon Everett - Guitar and Bajo Sexto
 Josh Woods - Bass
 Anthony De La Garza - Drums and Percussion
 Arturo Castillo - Alto Sax
 Alex Pulido - Trumpet and Keyboards

Discography and videography
 Who I Am (2009) - features a special guest appearance by Tejano artist Ram Herrera.
 On My Way (2010) introduced Castillo's younger brother, Sergio Castillo, and features special guest appearances by Tejano artists David Lee Garza and Mark Ledesma.
 The MixTape (2011)
 Up Close and Personal DVD (2012)
 The New Movement (2012)
 Sin Límites (2014)
 AJ Castillo LIVE from Tucson, AZ DVD/Blu-Ray (2016)
 AJ Castillo (2018)
 Live From Lubbock Texas (2020)
 An Accordion Christmas EP (2020) - features a special appearance by Grammy Award Winning Contemporary Jazz/R&B artist Norman Brown.

Awards and recognition
 2010 Tejano Music Awards Best New Male Artist 
 2010 Tejano Academy's Best Overall Accordion Player 
 2010 Tejano Academy's Best Emerging Artist/Group 
 2016 City of Austin proclaims September 1, 2016, as AJ Castillo Day
 2017 Collaboration on 2017 Latin Grammy Award winning Best Regional Song “Siempre Es Así”
 2021 Premios Tejano Mundial Entertainer of the Year
 2021 Tejano All Star Music Awards Male Entertainer of the Year

References

External links
 

1994 births
Living people
American accordionists
American musicians of Mexican descent
Singers from Texas
Spanish-language singers of the United States
Tejano pop musicians
Tejano accordionists
21st-century accordionists
21st-century American singers
21st-century American male musicians
Hispanic and Latino American musicians